Morphic was an American heavy metal band formed in Royal Oak, Michigan, in 2000. The band's final lineup consisted of John Webb (lead vocals), Josh DeVries (guitar), Wes Alfonsi (bass guitar), Andrew Hale (lead guitar) and Matt  (drums, percussion). Previously, the group also featured guitarist Tomo Miličević, who joined Thirty Seconds to Mars in 2003.

The band was formed under the name Loki; later they agreed on changing its name to Morphic. By 2001, the group performed gigs at small Michigan venues and clubs. During this period, the band recorded demo tracks such as "Smart" and "The Priest". Arthur Spivak, who had seen the group at a showcase concert at The Viper Room in Los Angeles, offered to become the band's manager in the summer of 2001. During the year, Morphic opened concerts for The Used and 12 Stones.

In 2002, Miličević left the band (he later joined Thirty Seconds to Mars) and was replaced by Andrew Hale. Morphic then entered the studio to begin working on their EP Low Frequency Response, which was eventually released on June 28, 2003. A writer from The Flint Journal felt that the band "pushed themselves further with their art" and came out in "full force". To promote the album, Morphic went on tour with Trapt, Dark New Day, and Kittie. They also played concerts for Saliva, Thirty Seconds to Mars, and Finger Eleven.

Morphic went on indefinite hiatus in 2006. Webb and Alfonsi later formed Love Meets Lust in January 2007.

Members 
 Final members
 Wes Alfonsi – bass (2000–2006)
 Josh DeVries – rhythm guitar (2000–2006)
 Andrew Hale – lead guitar (2002–2006)
 Matt  – drums, percussion (2000–2006)
 John Webb – lead vocals (2000–2006)

 Former members
 Tomo Miličević – lead guitar (2000–2002)

References 

2000 establishments in Michigan
2006 disestablishments in Michigan
Heavy metal musical groups from Michigan
Musical groups established in 2000
Musical groups disestablished in 2006
Musical groups from Michigan
Musical quintets